Listed below are executive orders, presidential proclamations, national security study memorandums and national security decision memorandums signed by United States President Richard Nixon. His executive actions are also listed on WikiSource.

Executive orders

1969

1970

1971

1972

1973

1974

References

External links 
 Executive Orders from Richard Nixon, 1969-1974, The American Presidency Project
 Executive Orders Disposition Tables, National Archives, Federal Register

 
United States federal policy